Mr Justice Mann may refer to:

 Anthony Mann (judge) (born 1951), justice of the High Court of England and Wales since 2004
 Frederick Mann (1869–1958), chief justice of the Australian state of Victoria
 Michael Mann (judge) (1930–1998), justice of the High Court of Justice of England from 1982 to 1988
 Thomas P. Mann (born 1965), justice of the Supreme Court of Virginia